2022 Spanish regional elections may refer to:

2022 Castilian-Leonese regional election
2022 Andalusian regional election